The 2012 St Helens Metropolitan Borough Council election took place on 3 May 2012 to elect members of St Helens Metropolitan Borough Council in Merseyside, England. One third of the council was up for election and the LabourPparty stayed in overall control of the council.

At the end of the election, the composition of the council was:
Labour 40
Liberal Democrats 5
Conservative 3

Background
Before the start of the election, Labour ran the council with 35 seats, while the Liberal Democrats had 9 seats and the Conservatives had 4 seats. 16 seats were contested in 2012, with Labour defending 9, Liberal Democrats 5 and the Conservatives 2.

Five councillors stood down at the election, two Conservatives, Betty Lowe and the former leader of the Conservative group Wally Ashcroft, two Labour members Leon McGuire and Eric Smith, and one Liberal Democrat, John Beirne. Meanwhile, a former Liberal Democrat cabinet member, Carole Kavanagh, resigned her membership of the party over the policies of the national coalition government and defended her seat as an independent candidate.

While the Conservative, Labour and the Green parties contested every seat, the Liberal Democrats only put up candidates in 9 of the 16 wards.

Election result
Labour gained 5 seats at the election to have 40 of the 48 councillors on St Helens council. The Liberal Democrats lost 4 seats to Labour to be reduced to 5 councillors, while the Conservatives lost 1 seat to have 3 councillors.

The Labour gains included defeating both the Liberal Democrat group leader and councillor for 27 years, Brian Spencer, in Sutton and the Liberal Democrat deputy leader Suzanne Knight in Newton. The Liberal Democrats held only one seat at the 2012 election in Eccleston, while the Conservatives held one seat in Rainford. Meanwhile, after contesting every seat at the election, the Greens failed to win any seats, but did come second in Blackbrook, Thatto Heath and West Park wards.

Brian Spencer, the former Liberal Democrat leader of St Helens council, was involved in an altercation with an Labour candidate, Mark Johnson, at the election count and would later in 2012 be convicted and fined for assault over the incident.

Ward results

By-elections between 2012 and 2014

Windle
A by-election was held in Windle on 2 May 2013 after the death of Labour councillor Pat Martinez-Williams. The seat was held for Labour by David Baines with a majority of 717 votes over Conservative Robert Reynolds.

Billinge and Seneley Green
A by-election was held in Billinge and Seneley Green on 28 November 2013 after the resignation of Labour councillor Alison Bacon. The seat was held for Labour by Dennis McDonnell with a majority of 494 votes over UK Independence Party candidate Laurence Allen.

References

2012 English local elections
2012
2010s in Merseyside